Studenkovići is a village in Bosnia and Herzegovina. According to the 1991 census, the village is located in the municipality of Istočni Stari Grad.

References

Populated places in Istočni Stari Grad
Villages in Republika Srpska